Kadua laxiflora (formerly Hedyotis mannii) is a rare species of flowering plant in the coffee family known by the common names Mann's bluet and Hawaiian pilo.  It is endemic to Hawaii, where it is known from Molokai, Lanai, and Maui. It is known to exist at four locations for a global population of under 100 plants. It is a federally listed endangered species of the United States.

This is a subshrub with clusters of greenish white flowers. Threats to its existence include non-native plant species.

References

External links
USDA Plants Profile

laxiflora
Endemic flora of Hawaii
Biota of Lanai
Biota of Maui
Biota of Molokai